The 2011–12 Milwaukee Panthers men's basketball team represented the University of Wisconsin–Milwaukee during the 2011–12 NCAA Division I men's basketball season. The Panthers, led by seventh year head coach Rob Jeter, played their home games at U.S. Cellular Arena, with two home games played at the Klotsche Center, and are members of the Horizon League. They finished the season 20–14, 11–7 in Horizon League play to finish in a three-way tie for third place. They lost in the quarterfinals of the Horizon League Basketball tournament to Butler. They were invited to the 2012 College Basketball Invitational where they lost in the first round to TCU.

2011 recruiting class

Coaching staff

Roster

2011–12 Schedule and results
All times are Central
All conference games are aired on horizon league.com

|-
!colspan=9| Exhibition

|-
!colspan=9| Regular season

|-

|-

|-

|-
!colspan=9| Horizon League tournament

|-
!colspan=9| 2012 College Basketball Invitational

Rankings

References

Milwaukee Panthers men's basketball seasons
Milwaukee Panthers
Milwaukee